PRKC, apoptosis, WT1, regulator, also known as PAWR or Prostate apoptosis response-4 (Par-4), is a human gene coding for a tumor-suppressor protein that induces apoptosis in cancer cells, but not in normal cells.

Function 

The tumor suppressor WT1 represses and activates transcription. The protein encoded by this gene is a WT1-interacting protein that itself functions as a transcriptional repressor. It contains a putative leucine zipper domain which interacts with the zinc finger DNA binding domain of WT1. This protein is specifically upregulated during apoptosis of prostate cells.
The active domain of the Par-4 protein has been found to confer cancer resistance in transgenic mice without compromising normal viability or aging, and may have therapeutic significance.

Interactions 

PAWR has been shown to interact with:

 Apoptosis antagonizing transcription factor, 
 DAPK3, 
 Protein kinase Mζ,
 SLC5A1, 
 THAP1,  and
 WT1.

References

Further reading